A list of films released in Japan in 1987 (see 1987 in film).

See also 
 1987 in Japan
 1987 in Japanese television

References

Footnotes

Sources

External links
 Japanese films of 1987 at the Internet Movie Database

1987
Lists of 1987 films by country or language
Films